Henri Poupon (1884–1953) was a French stage and film actor. He worked a number of times with the write-director Marcel Pagnol.

Selected filmography
 The Fortune (1931)
 To the Polls, Citizens (1932)
 Angèle (1934)
 Jofroi (1934)
 Merlusse (1935)
 Topaze (1936)
 Lady Killer (1937)
 Hercule (1938)
 Heartbeat (1938)
 Stormy Waters (1941)
 Jeannou (1943)
 Arlette and Love (1943)
 The Winner's Circle (1950)
 The Blonde Gypsy (1953)

References

Bibliography 
 Ann C. Paietta. Teachers in the Movies: A Filmography of Depictions of Grade School, Preschool and Day Care Educators, 1890s to the Present. McFarland, 2007.

External links 
 

1884 births
1953 deaths
Male actors from Marseille
French male film actors
French male stage actors